Terra Venture Partners is an Israeli venture capital fund focused on clean technology. Terra Venture Partners was Israel's most active venture capital fund in 2009 in terms of first investments. The fund, established in 2006,
currently has $25 million under management.
Terra was founded by Astorre Modena and Harold Wiener as a fund dedicated to investing in early stage Israeli cleantech companies. However, the fund is relatively flexible on the definition of cleantech. Most of the fund's companies are focused on energy efficiency and storage, rather than the traditional cleantech fields such as solar power.

Portfolio companies

BAS is developing a real-time biological agent detection system that performs on-line air & water monitoring. The early-detection, real-time system is targeted mainly for industrial applications for water and air monitoring in food and pharmaceutical processes, in hospitals, and in airports.
EVida is developing and producing specialty battery packs and battery management systems for the EV market, particularly in the commercial fleet sector.
IQWind is developing a gearbox for wind turbines. Its product is an add-on to existing or new wind turbines that enables the turbines to work at higher efficiency rates.
Linum Systems is developing solar air conditioning technology.
Phoebus Energy has developed a hybrid water heating system which saves fuel consumption and reduces carbon emissions.
PV Nano Cell Ltd. is developing disruptive technologies in the manufacturing process of silicon solar cells.  PV Nano Cell's products are designed to be implemented in non-contact metallization technologies, by replacing the screen printing metallization with an inkjet printing process. PV Nano Cell's inks are based on nano-metric materials and are aimed to serve and capture a substantial part of the growing $2.4B solar ink market by 2015.
Silentium is active in the field of Spatial and Broadband active noise control (ANC).
SmarTap provides water taps.
Wi-Charge is developing a patented system that will allow room-range wireless charging for a wide variety of applications, from mobile phones to laptops and flat screen TVs.
Saccade Vision is developing an inovative 3D insudtrial scanner.

See also
 Venture capital in Israel

References

External links 
 Terra Venture Partners Homepage

Financial services companies established in 2006
Venture capital firms of Israel
Financial services companies of Israel
Solar power in Israel
Companies based in Jerusalem